Wuxi Maoye City - Marriott Hotel is a  supertall skyscraper located in Wuxi, Jiangsu, China. Construction began in 2008 and ended in 2014. The building was one of the first supertalls in the city. Its core is made of reinforced concrete and is clad in a glass curtain wall. Belt trusses hide the mechanical floor on floors 26 and 46.

See also
List of tallest buildings in China
List of tallest buildings in the world

References

Skyscrapers in Wuxi
Hotels in Wuxi
Marriott hotels
Skyscraper hotels in China
2014 establishments in China
Hotels established in 2014
Hotel buildings completed in 2014